Bhoodana is a 1962 Indian Kannada-language film jointly directed and produced by G. V. Iyer and P.S. Gopalkrishna. The film stars Rajkumar, Kalyan Kumar, Udaykumar and K. S. Ashwath. The film has musical score by G. K. Venkatesh.

The movie starred Rajkumar, Kalyan Kumar and Udaykumar -  all 3 in full-fledged roles in a single movie for the only time in their career. All 3 had also worked together earlier in Gaali Gopura, however, Udaykumar only had a special appearance in that movie. Also, this is the only movie in which Rajkumar played the role of father to Kalyan Kumar and Udaykumar. This is also the only movie where Leelavathi played the role of Rajkumar's daughter.

The theme of the movie was based on Vinoba Bhave's Bhoodan movement and also takes its inspiration from the novel Chomana Dudi by K. Shivaram Karanth. The movie also speaks about the religious conversion of the marginalized. S. K. Bhagavan had revealed that while working as an assistant on this movie, they had approached Shivaram Karanth to procure the rights of Chomana Dudi to make it into a movie. However, Karanth refused to officially sell the copyrights but permitted them to make a movie based on the story. A. Bhimsingh remade the movie in Tamil in 1965 as Pazhani starring Sivaji Ganesan.

Cast

Rajkumar as Dasanna
Kalyan Kumar as Lachha
Udaykumar as Rama
G. V. Iyer as Landlord Laxmipathy
K. S. Ashwath
Narasimharaju
Balakrishna
H. R. Shastry
Veerabhadrappa
Bharadwaj
Kupparaj
Mahalinga Bhagavathar
Narayanaswamy
Murthy
Leelavathi
Advani Lakshmi Devi
Shakunthala
Vijayakumari
Jayalakshmi

References

External links
 
 

1962 films
1960s Kannada-language films
Films scored by G. K. Venkatesh
Films directed by G. V. Iyer
Kannada films remade in other languages